Fernando de la Calle Pozo (born 8 August 1970 in Valladolid) is a Spanish rugby union player. He plays as a scrum-half and as hooker.

Career
His first international cap was during a match against Argentina, at Madrid, on October 24, 1992. He was part of the 1999 Rugby World Cup roster, playing all the three matches. His last international cap was during a match against Italy, at his hometown, on September 22, 2002. He retired as player in 2013.

References

External links

1970 births
Living people
Sportspeople from Valladolid
Spanish rugby union players
Rugby union scrum-halves
Rugby union hookers
Spain international rugby union players